The Carmichael House is a historic house at 13905 Arch Street Pike in Landmark, Arkansas.  The property is a  gentleman farmer's estate, with a main house, barn, hog shed, and other farm outbuildings.  The principal structures are built out of stone, with the house having terra cotta tile elements as well.  It is Craftsman in style, with a shallow pitch gable roof that has deep eaves and exposed rafters.  The estate was developed in the 1930s by John Hugh Carmichael and his wife 1st wife Amelia. Lily, his second wife, sold the property after he died in 1958.  The property is a good example of rural Craftsman-style gentleman's farm.

The property was purchase in 1967 by Paul Hodge and Karen Hodge. It was converted from a Gentleman's Farm to a Thoroughbred Racing Farm and it served as such until 1985.

The house was listed on the National Register of Historic Places in 2018.

See also
National Register of Historic Places listings in Pulaski County, Arkansas

References

Houses on the National Register of Historic Places in Arkansas
American Craftsman architecture in Arkansas
Houses completed in 1935
National Register of Historic Places in Pulaski County, Arkansas